The 1927 All-Western college football team consists of American football players selected to the All-Western teams chosen by various selectors for the 1927 college football season.

All-Western selections

Ends
 Bennie Oosterbaan, Michigan (JC) (CFHOF)
 Waldo A. Fisher, Northwestern (JC)

Tackles
 Leo Raskowski, Ohio State (JC)
 Mike Gary, Minnesota (JC)

Guards
 Robert Reitsch, Illinois (JC)
 John "Clipper" Smith, Notre Dame (JC) (CFHOF)

Centers
 Ken Rouse, Illinois (JC)

Quarterbacks
 Harold Almquist, Minnesota (JC)

Halfbacks
 Glenn Presnell, Nebraska (JC)
 Christy Flanagan, Notre Dame (JC)

Fullbacks
 Herb Joesting, Minnesota (JC) (CFHOF)

Key
JC = Jimmy Corcoran in Chicago Evening American

CFHOF = College Football Hall of Fame

See also
1927 College Football All-America Team
1927 All-Big Ten Conference football team

References

1927 Big Ten Conference football season
All-Western college football teams